Monaville may refer to:

Monaville, Illinois,  an unincorporated community in Lake Villa Township, Lake County, Illinois, United States
Monaville, Texas,  an unincorporated community in Waller County, Texas, United States
Monaville, West Virginia, a census-designated place in Logan County, West Virginia, United States